The 2011 Challenge Casino de Charlevoix was held from November 24 to 27 at the Aréna de Clermont in Clermont, Québec as part of the 2011–12 World Curling Tour. The purse for the event was CAD$37,000, and the winner, Brett Gallant, received CAD$12,000. The event was held in a triple-knockout format.

Teams

Knockout results

A event

B event

C event

Playoffs

External links

Challenge Casino de Charlevoix
Curling competitions in Quebec
Capitale-Nationale
2011 in Quebec